Youba Ndiaye Sissokho (born 7 November 1991) is a Senegalese-born Spanish boxer. He competed in the men's welterweight event at the 2016 Summer Olympics. He was born in Dakar and moved to Majorca at six months.

References

External links
 
 
 
 

1991 births
Living people
Sportspeople from Dakar
Senegalese emigrants to Spain
Naturalised citizens of Spain
Spanish people of Senegalese descent
Spanish male boxers
Olympic boxers of Spain
Boxers at the 2016 Summer Olympics
Mediterranean Games silver medalists for Spain
Competitors at the 2013 Mediterranean Games
Competitors at the 2018 Mediterranean Games
Mediterranean Games medalists in boxing
European Games competitors for Spain
Boxers at the 2015 European Games
Welterweight boxers